Vivandière may refer to:

Vivandière a generic name for women attached to military regiments
La Vivandière, an 1844 ballet choreographed by Arthur Saint-Léon.
La Vivandière (Gilbert), an 1867 musical play by W. S. Gilbert